The Masters of Madness Tour (also known as the Shock Therapy Tour) was the double bill North American concert tour co-headlined by American rock bands Alice Cooper and Marilyn Manson. Launched in support of Cooper's 26th full-length studio LP, 2011's Welcome 2 My Nightmare and Manson's 8th full-length studio LP, 2012's Born Villain, the tour visited stadiums from June 1, 2013 through July 7, 2013.

Tour
Prior to the commencement of the tour, Manson performed two shows as part of the tour without the company of Cooper, the first was in San Diego, and the second was in Tempe, on May 29, 2013, and May 30, 2013, respectively. Manson and Cooper kicked off their co-headlined tour on June 1, 2013, at the Isleta Amphitheater in Albuquerque. The opening act for this tour was a Hollywood, CA band, Picture Me Broken. Its lead singer, Layla 'Brooklyn' Allman is the daughter of Gregg Allman. The band's drummer (Shaun Foist) went on to become the drummer for alternative rock band, Breaking Benjamin.

Line-up

Set List

Alice Cooper:

 "Hello Hooray"
 "House of Fire"
 "No More Mr. Nice Guy"
 "Billion Dollar Babies"
 "I'll Bite Your Face Off"
 "Is It My Body"
 "Under My Wheels"
 "Hey Stoopid"
 "Poison"
 "Dirty Diamonds"
 "Welcome to My Nightmare"
 "Go to Hell"
 "Feed My Frankenstein"
 "Ballad of Dwight Fry"
 "I Love the Dead"
 "School's Out"

Encore:

 "I'm Eighteen"

 Marilyn Manson:

 "Angel With the Scabbed Wings"
 "Disposable Teens"
 "No Reflection"
 "The Dope Show"
 "Rock is Dead"
 "Great Big White World"
 "Personal Jesus"
 "mOBSCENE"
 "Sweet Dreams (Are Made of This)"
 "This is the New Shit"
 "Antichrist Superstar"
 "The Beautiful People"

Tour dates

References

2013 concert tours
Alice Cooper concert tours
Co-headlining concert tours
Marilyn Manson (band) concert tours